was a Muromachi period Japanese castle located in Kawabe District of northern Settsu Province (what is now the city of Itami, Hyōgo Prefecture), Japan. It is also called .Its ruins have been protected as a National Historic Site since 1979. The ruins of the castle are located just in front of today's Itami Station.

History
Itami Castle was constructed by the Itami clans minor samurai clan who controlled this area of Settsu Province in the Nanboku-chō period. It was extensively remodeled in 1472.  In 1574, Araki Murashige demolished the castle, and rebuilt it as one of the largest castles in this region. He also changed its name from Itami Castle to Arioka Castle. However, after Araki rebelled against Oda Nobunaga, the castle was attacked during the Siege of Itami (1579). According to Turnbull, the castle was captured "by digging a long tunnel from outside the walls to a spot near to the castle's keep." The castle was awarded to Ikeda Motosuke, one of Nobunaga's generals, in 1580. Ikeda was transferred to a new domain in Mino Province in 1583 and the castle was abandoned.

At its height, the castle extended from 1.7 kilometers north-to-south by 0.8 kilometers east-to-west, and was an early example of a  type of fortification in which the entire castle town forms part of the defenses by being completely encircled by moats and earthen ramparts, and with the arrangement of streets and townhouses planned as part of the defensive belt.  The Itami River, Daroku River and the Ina River form part of the natural fortifications, and were connected by moats on the west and south. Three fortresses were placed a key points on the outer defense line. The structure was strong enough to withstand attacks by Oda Nobunaga's large army for a year.

The east side of the castle site was destroyed in 1891 due to railway construction, and most of Honmaru (inner bailey) has been lost. Archaeological excavations were performed on the site from 1975, with remnants of moats, wells and stone walls uncovered. The stone walls incorporated gravestones and  stone pagodas which had been plundered from Buddhist temples in the vicinity. The castle site is now open as a public park.

Access
Itami Station (Hankyu) of Hankyu Itami Line
Itami Station (JR West) of Fukuchiyama Line

See also
List of Historic Sites of Japan (Hyōgo)
Inano Shrine

Further reading

References

External links

Itami City homepage

Castles in Hyōgo Prefecture
Historic Sites of Japan
Itami, Hyōgo
Settsu Province